Eureka River is an unincorporated community in northern Alberta in Clear Hills County, located  north of Highway 64,  north of Grande Prairie.

Climate

References 

Localities in Clear Hills County